West Woodward Airport  is in Woodward County, Oklahoma, United States, seven miles west of Woodward, which owns it. The National Plan of Integrated Airport Systems for 2011–2015 called it a general aviation airport.

History 
Second Air Force until 1944. Sub-field of Will Rogers Field.

354th Army Air Forces Base Unit

Central Airlines scheduled flights to Woodward from 1950 to 1957.

Facilities
The airport covers 1,310 acres (530 ha) at an elevation of 2,189 feet (667 m). It has two runways: 17/35 is 5,502 by 100 feet (1,677 x 30 m) concrete, and 5/23 is 2,500 by 60 feet (762 x 18 m) asphalt.

In the year ending June 2, 2011 the airport had 6,000 general aviation aircraft operations, average 16 per day. 36 aircraft were then based at the airport: 86% single-engine, 6% multi-engine, 3% jet, and 6% ultralight.

References

External links 
 

Airports in Oklahoma
Buildings and structures in Woodward County, Oklahoma